The Kondor D 1, given the unofficial name Kondorlaus, was a German single seat, biplane fighter aircraft designed and built close to the end of WWI.

Design and development
The Kondor D 1 was an unequal span single-seat biplane of wooden construction, powered by a  Gnome Monosoupape rotary engine and armed with two  LMG 08/15 Spandau machine guns. The D 1 had a single spar lower wing with V interplane struts, similar to Nieuport 11 practice.
 
The first flight of the Kondor D 1 occurred in the autumn of 1917, but test flights showed it to be underpowered and Walter Rethel, with Paul Ehrhardt, developed an improved version of the design, the Kondor D 2, which Rethel completed after Ehrhardt retired due to ill health.

Confusion reigned after the second D-type competition at Aldershof because the Idflieg referred to the two Kondor D 2 prototypes as the D.I and D.II during the competition, which were actually fictitious designations.

Specifications (D 1)

References

Bibliography

 

Biplanes
Single-engined tractor aircraft
1910s German fighter aircraft
Aircraft first flown in 1917
Rotary-engined aircraft